The Radio Independents Group, or RIG, is the trade body that represents the interests of the independent radio producers of the United  Kingdom.  Established in June 2004, RIG is mandated to negotiate terms with broadcasters and audio consumers such as digital publishers, that are to the benefit of its members.  The organisation is a non-profit making body, solely financed through membership fees and donations.

Current Executive Committee (as of June 2015)
Chair: Phil Critchlow [TBI Media]  
Vice-chair: Mike Hally [Square Dog Radio]  
Secretary: Trevor Dann [Trevor Dann's Company]  
Treasurer: Jack Wynne-Williams [Acme] 

Directors
Ashley Byrne [Made in Manchester] 
Andy Cartwright [Soundscape]  
Sue Clark [Sue Clark Productions]  
Simon Cole [7digital] 
Janet Graves [Pennine Productions]  
Rob Jones [USP]  
Susan Marling [Just Radio]  
Jez Nelson [Somethin' Else]  
David Prest [Whistledown]  
Dan Vo [Heavy Entertainment]

Membership

Membership of RIG is open to any UK-based independent radio producer or production company.  RIG membership represents some 95% of total industry turnover.  The trade body represents all sizes of business from sole-traders and partnerships, to limited companies and public companies.

Independent Radio Producers

An independent radio producer is defined as a supplier of radio programmes who is not affiliated in any manner with the commissioning broadcaster or company.  They can be individuals working in a sole-traders and partnerships, as well as limited companies and in some instances public companies.  There are some indies in radio who are also independent television producers.  Many radio indies supply additional audio, training, teaching and various other services due to the low budgets inherent in the industry.

The Sector

For the majority of radio indies the BBC national radio networks are the main, or only, commissioner of their programs.  BBC Radio 1, BBC Radio 2, BBC Radio 3, BBC Radio 4, BBC 5 Live, BBC 6 Music, BBC 1Xtra, BBC Asian Network, BBC World Service, BBC Radio Scotland and BBC Radio Wales all actively commission independently produced programming.  Unlike the television sector, which has a legally guaranteed 25% share of the BBC's output (with an additional 25% open to competitive bidding), the radio sector has no such guarantee.  The BBC chooses to voluntarily offer approximately 10% of its 'eligible' hours to independent production.  This figure has not changed in over 13 years and both the BBC and the British Government refuse to alter the status quo.  This has led to an unstable and uncertain sector with large numbers of companies pitching for small amounts of air-time.  The Radio Independents Group is tasked with getting the voluntary 'quota' increased.

Radio indies also produce many hours of programming for the Commercial Radio companies, such as chart shows, traffic & travel bulletins and entertainment news.  However, unlike the BBC, the majority of this material is paid for by third party sponsors rather than by the radio stations.  There is very little commissioned programming on UK commercial radio due to the cost of making such material and the low programming budgets of commercial radio stations.

Radio Indies & The BBC

Up until Dec 2004, when commissioning programs from independent producers, the BBC would purchase an 'all rights' deal.  This meant that the independent producer retained no ownership or control over their product.  Following negotiations between RIG and the BBC in 2004, the new Terms of Trade now in place have had a considerable positive effect for independent producers:

 Indies now own their productions entirely
 The BBC purchases a 10-year UK-only broadcast license consisting of 2 transmissions and audio-on-demand rights
 Indies can now commercially exploit their productions both in the UK and internationally
 Indies gain improved repeat rates and improved rates for repeats on BBC World Service and BFBS

The BBC has a requirement written into the BBC Agreement  to commission a 'suitable proportion' of radio programming from independent producers, which it has set at 10% of 'eligible' hours (i.e. excluding news).

In 2010 the BBC Trust published a report  requiring the BBC to operate an additional Window of Creative Competition, set at 10% of eligible hours, encompassing programming for which independents can compete against in-house producers.

In June 2015 the BBC Director of Radio Helen Boaden announced the intention  as part of the BBC's 'Compete or Compare' initiative, to put out 60% of eligible radio hours to competition from indie and in-house producers, a target to be reached over a six-year period.

Radio Production Awards

The RIG since 2010 has organized the Radio Production Awards, supported by the Radio Academy. The awards "recognise and celebrate the production  skills of radio and audio producers based in the UK or supplying UK-based broadcasters from overseas."

Current Issues

 BBC World Service - new Terms of Trade between the network and the independent sector
 Update to the General BBC Terms of Trade
 Update and continuation of BBC Worldwide BFBS contracts
 Submission to the BBC Trust regarding the damage to indie's rights by the planned BBC Online/iPlayer proposal
 Push for more opportunities and access to air-time for independent producers
 Creation of standardised industry 'draft' contracts
 Supporting the work of the Radio Academy and the Radio Industry Diversity Group
 Training and resources for radio independents

References

External links
 RIG Website
 The Radio Academy Website
 BBC Independent Commissioning Website

Radio in the United Kingdom